Jonathan Marc Pasvolsky (born 26 July 1972), also known as Jonny Pasvolsky, is a South African-born Australian actor.

Early life and education
Pasvolsky was born on July 26, 1972, in Cape Town, South Africa, to a Jewish family. He was raised in Australia. He studied acting at the Victorian College of the Arts in Melbourne.

Career
Pasvolsky is best known for his role (Rob Shelton/Matt Bosnich, 2005–2007) in McLeod's Daughters, which he received a nomination for as "Most Popular New Male Talent" at the Logie Awards of 2006. He has also appeared in the second Underbelly series, Underbelly: A Tale of Two Cities, and has had guest roles in several Australian television series: SeaChange, Farscape, and All Saints. He starred as Mr. Hooper in Hey, Hey, It's Esther Blueburger and played Antonio Morelli in the UK.TV mini-series False Witness. In 2010 he guest starred in an episode of the popular Australian TV Series Sea Patrol. He appeared in a starring role, as the moustached villain in the Johnny Depp 2015 film Mortdecai. And was in an episode in Season One of the hit new TV series 2016 Westworld in a scene with actor Thandie Newton.

Personal life
Pasvolsky and wife Carolyn welcomed a baby girl, Marlena Sierra Pasvolsky, on Tuesday 23 October 2007 in Sydney. They have since welcomed Sylvie Star in August 2009 and Viola Emery Rose in March 2012.

Acting
 1999 Farscape (3 episodes) as Pennoch
2001 McLeod's Daughters (224 episodes)
2003 Proof as Hal
2006 Macbeth as Lennox
2008 Underbelly (10 episodes) as Dave Priest
2008 Hey Hey It's Esther Blueburger as Mr Hooper
2008 Blood as Tony Kovac
2009 Diplomat as Antonio Morelli
2012 The Moodys as Matt Capello
2013 Mr & Mrs Murder as Peter Vinetti
2013 Miss Fisher's Murder Mysteries S2:E2 "Death Comes Knocking" as Warwick Hamilton
2015 Mortdecai as Emil Strago
2016 Westworld as Bloody Jimmy
2018 Picnic at Hanging Rock as Sergeant Bumpher
2018 Rabbit as Henry
2018 The Front Runner as Steve Dunleavy

References

External links

 Jonny Pasvolsky Official Website
 McLeod's Daughters Official Website
 Jonny Pasvolsky Net
 "From shearing sheep to Shakespeare on the street"

1972 births
Living people
Jewish Australian male actors
South African emigrants to Australia
South African Jews
Australian Jews
Male actors from Cape Town
Victorian College of the Arts alumni
Australian children's television presenters